The Vienna and Earl Apartment Buildings are Neo-Classical Revival residences, built and designed in 1907  by Louis F. Lockwood and Carl P. Waldon, located 2 blocks north of Summit Avenue in Saint Paul, Minnesota. The buildings are Registered Historic Places.

References

Residential buildings completed in 1907
National Register of Historic Places in Saint Paul, Minnesota
Residential buildings on the National Register of Historic Places in Minnesota
Apartment buildings in Minnesota
Neoclassical architecture in Minnesota
Residential buildings in Saint Paul, Minnesota